Spangenberg is a small town in northeastern Hesse, Germany.

Spangenberg may also refer to:
 Spangenberg (surname), including a list of people with the name
 Spangenberg Castle (disambiguation)
 USS Spangenberg (DE-223), a Buckley-class destroyer escort

See also
 Charles Spangenberg Farmstead, Woodbury, Minnesota
 Frederick Spangenberg House, Saint Paul, Minnesota